This is a list of notable events in country music that took place in 2013.

Events
 January – A brief feud erupts between Blake Shelton and country legend Ray Price when Shelton criticized veteran country performers who don't agree with the direction in which the genre is going, claiming "(n)obody wants to listen to their grandpa's music." Price was offended and publicly expressed his disapproval in a Facebook post, prompting Shelton to issue an apology on Twitter. Several days later, Price accepted the apology. "I agree that he should be given a chance to restore his credibility with the millions of fans who were deeply offended by those hurtful words," Price wrote as part of his Facebook post responding to Shelton's apology.
 January 21 – The first Nash FM-branded station – a media brand and network owned by Cumulus Media – is WNSH (Nash 94.7) in Newark, New Jersey (serving the New York City metropolitan area). The Nash FM brand focuses on current hits (along with scattered recurrents from the past 2–3 years); a year later, a Nash Icon brand will be added, mixing in current hits with songs from the 1980s onward. The first song played on the station is "How Country Feels" by Randy Houser. It becomes the first country music radio station in NYC and NJ since 1996.
 February 17 – Mindy McCready, whose personal and legal problems overshadowed her promising future as a rising female vocalist of the late 1990s, is found dead of an apparent suicide at her home in Heber Springs, Arkansas. Her death came a month after the death of her boyfriend, songwriter David Wilson.
 March 2 – The Country Top 30 with Bobby Bones, a radio show hosted by Austin, Texas, radio personality Bobby Estell (aka Bobby Bones), debuts in syndication.
 April 24 – The Chatham County, Georgia Grand Jury indicted Billy Currington on felony criminal charges of "abuse of an elder person by inflicting mental anguish" and "making terroristic threats". Both criminal charges stem from an April 15 incident involving Charles Harvey Ferrelle, with the indictment alleging that Currington made terrorist threats and drove too close to Ferrelle's boat in a manner that he nearly knocked the elderly man into the water. Currington  – released after posting $27,000 bond – faces a prison term of 1 to 5 years if convicted.
 July 7 – Randy Travis is hospitalized in critical condition with viral cardiomyopathy. Four days later, he suffers a stroke and undergoes surgery to relieve pressure on his brain.
 August 10 – With 22 weeks at No. 1, "Cruise" by Florida Georgia Line sets a new record for most weeks at No. 1 on the Billboard Hot Country Songs chart, breaking a three-way tie of 21 weeks at No. 1 jointly held by Eddy Arnold ("I'll Hold You in My Heart (Till I Can Hold You in My Arms)," 1947), Hank Snow ("I'm Movin' On," 1950) and Webb Pierce ("In the Jailhouse Now," 1955). "Cruise" benefited from changes in Billboard's methodology, made in 2012, from a country airplay-only chart to one that reflects all-genre airplay, music downloads and streaming, similarly to the Hot 100. The song had earlier spent five weeks at No. 1 in late December into January, began falling but never dropping out of the top 40, before rebounding in April following the release of a remix with Nelly and eventually reclaiming the chart's No. 1 position.
 August 18 – Jody Rosen of New York coins the term "bro-country" to describe the genre's then-ongoing trend of hip-hop influenced country songs with a theme of partying.
 August 23 – In an interview with AARP, Linda Ronstadt reveals she has Parkinson's disease and can no longer sing.
 October 16 – Record producer Tony Brown, best known for producing George Strait, is arrested for domestic assault against his wife.
 December 15 – Numerous media outlets, from Rolling Stone to the USA Today, prematurely reported that Ray Price had died from pancreatic cancer. The information came from Price's son, Cliff, who posted via Facebook his father's apparent passing, but it was later retracted, according to The Tennessean (which also published a news story on Price's death that was later removed). Price died the next day, with family spokesman Bill Mack confirming the death.

Top hits of the year
The following songs placed within the Top 20 on the Hot Country Songs, Country Airplay or Canada Country charts in 2013:

Singles released by American artists

Singles released by Canadian artists

Notes
"—" denotes releases that did not chart

Top new album releases
The following albums placed within the Top 50 on the Top Country Albums charts in 2013:

Other top albums

Deaths
 January 1 – Patti Page, 85, traditional pop singer who was one of the most successful music artists of the 1950s and best known for her classic country-pop hit, "Tennessee Waltz."
 January 30  – Patty Andrews, 94, last surviving member of vocal pop group The Andrews Sisters who had three top ten country hits in the 1940s.
February 17 – Mindy McCready, 37, country vocalist from the mid-to-late 1990s, best known for "Guys Do It All the Time" (suicide)
March 6 – Stompin' Tom Connors, 77, Canadian country singer from the 1970s, best known for "The Hockey Song" (natural causes)
March 6 – Claude King, 90, singer/songwriter known for his million selling 1962 hit "Wolverton Mountain" (natural causes)
March 14 – Jack Greene, 83, American country musician nicknamed the "Jolly Green Giant" and well known for his 1966 hit "There Goes My Everything" also for his 1969 hit "Statue of a Fool" (complications from Alzheimer's disease)
April 16 – Rita MacNeil, 68, Canadian country singer from the 1980s and 1990s (complications from surgery)
April 26 – George Jones, 81, country music icon from the 1950s onward, best known for hits such as "He Stopped Loving Her Today" and dozens of others. (acute hypoxia, from complications of fever and irregular blood pressure)
 May 24 – Lorene Mann, 76, singer-songwriter best known for her duets with Justin Tubb and Archie Campbell
 June 5 – Don Bowman, 75, original host of radio's American Country Countdown and writer of Waylon Jennings-Willie Nelson duet "Just to Satisfy You."
 June 19 – Slim Whitman, 90, country artist best known for his high-octave falsetto and yodeling abilities, and songs such as "Indian Love Call" and "Rose Marie"  (heart failure)
 June 19 – Chet Flippo, 69, journalist for Rolling Stone and Billboard, editorial director at Country Music Television
 July 8 – Johnny MacRae, 84, songwriter best known for "I'd Love to Lay You Down" (heart disease)
 July 29 – Betty Sue Lynn, 64, daughter of Country legend Loretta Lynn and her husband Oliver Lynn, dies of emphysema just outside her mother's ranch in Hurricane Mills, Tennessee. Betty Sue is the second of Lynn's children to die before her. 
 August 8 – Jack Clement, 82, songwriter and record producer known for his work with Johnny Cash
 August 10 – Jody Payne, 77, Willie Nelson's longtime guitarist
 August 13 – Tompall Glaser, 79, one-third of Tompall & the Glaser Brothers; also known for the solo single "Put Another Log on the Fire"
 September 17 – Marvin Rainwater, 88, was an American country and rockabilly singer and songwriter who had several hits during the late 1950s, including "Gonna Find Me a Bluebird"
 September 28 – B. B. Watson, 60, best known for his 1991 hit "Light at the End of the Tunnel"
 October 10 – Cal Smith, 81, best known for his 1974 hit "Country Bumpkin"
 October 20 – Leon Ashley, 77, best known for his 1967 hit "Laura (What's He Got That I Ain't Got)"
 October 29 – Sherman Halsey, 56, music video director best known for his work with Tim McGraw
 November 13 – Bob Beckham, 86, singer and music publisher
 November 21 – Nelson Larkin, 70, songwriter and producer
 December 16 – Ray Price, 87, country singer best known for his hits "For the Good Times", "Crazy Arms", "City Lights" and dozens more (pancreatic cancer)

Hall of Fame Inductees

Bluegrass Music Hall of Fame
 Tony Rice
 Paul Warren

Country Music Hall of Fame Inductees
 Bobby Bare (born 1935)
 "Cowboy" Jack Clement (1931–2013)
 Kenny Rogers (1938–2020)

Canadian Country Music Hall of Fame Inductees
 Ed Harris
 Rita MacNeil

Major awards

American Country Awards
(presented December 10 in Las Vegas)
Artist of the Year – Luke Bryan
Male Artist of the Year – Luke Bryan
Female Artist of the Year – Miranda Lambert
Group/Duo of the Year – Lady Antebellum
Touring Artist of the Year – Luke Bryan
Album of the Year – Based on a True Story..., Blake Shelton
Breakthrough Artist of the Year – Scotty McCreery
New Artist of the Year – Florida Georgia Line
Single of the Year – "Cruise", Florida Georgia Line
Male Single of the Year – "Sure Be Cool If You Did", Blake Shelton
Female Single of the Year – "Mama's Broken Heart", Miranda Lambert
Duo/Group Single of the Year – "Downtown", Lady Antebellum
Breakthrough Single of the Year – "I Drive Your Truck", Lee Brice
New Artist Single of the Year – "Cruise", Florida Georgia Line
Single by a Vocal Collaboration – "Highway Don't Care", Tim McGraw feat. Taylor Swift and Keith Urban
Music Video of the Year – "Sure Be Cool If You Did", Blake Shelton
Male Music Video of the Year – "Sure Be Cool If You Did", Blake Shelton
Female Music Video of the Year – "Blown Away", Carrie Underwood
Duo/Group Music Video of the Year – "Highway Don't Care", Tim McGraw feat. Taylor Swift and Keith Urban
New Artist Music Video of the Year – "Cruise", Florida Georgia Line
Song of the Year – "Highway Don't Care", Tim McGraw feat. Taylor Swift and Keith Urban

Academy of Country Music
(presented April 6, 2014 in Las Vegas)
Entertainer of the Year – George Strait
Top Male Vocalist – Jason Aldean
Top Female Vocalist – Miranda Lambert
Top Vocal Group – The Band Perry
Top Vocal Duo – Florida Georgia Line
Top New Artist – Justin Moore
Album of the Year – Same Trailer Different Park, Kacey Musgraves
Single Record of the Year – "Mama's Broken Heart", Miranda Lambert
Song of the Year – "I Drive Your Truck", Lee Brice
Video of the Year – "Highway Don't Care", Tim McGraw feat. Taylor Swift and Keith Urban
Vocal Event of the Year – "We Were Us", Keith Urban feat. Miranda Lambert

ACM Honors
Cliffie Stone Pioneer Award – The Judds
Cliffie Stone Pioneer Award – Keith Whitley
Crystal Milestone Award – Jason Aldean
Gene Weed Special Achievement Award – Blake Shelton
Jim Reeves International Award – Lady Antebellum
Mae Boren Axton Award – Tommy Wiggins
Poet's Award – Guy Clark
Poet's Award – Hank Williams
Songwriter of the Year – Dallas Davidson

Americana Music Honors & Awards 
Album of the Year – Old Yellow Moon (Emmylou Harris and Rodney Crowell)
Artist of the Year – Dwight Yoakam
Duo/Group of the Year – Emmylou Harris and Rodney Crowell
Song of the Year – "Birmingham" (Shovels & Rope)
Emerging Artist of the Year – Shovels & Rope
Instrumentalist of the Year – Larry Campbell
Spirit of Americana/Free Speech Award – Stephen Stills
Lifetime Achievement: Trailblazer – Old Crow Medicine Show
Lifetime Achievement: Songwriting – Robert Hunter
Lifetime Achievement: Performance – Dr John
Lifetime Achievement: Instrumentalist – Duane Eddy
Lifetime Achievement: Executive – Chris Strachwitz

American Music Awards
(presented in Los Angeles on November 24, 2013)
Artist of the Year – Taylor Swift
Favorite Country Female Artist – Taylor Swift
 Favorite Country Male Artist – Luke Bryan
Favorite Country Band/Duo/Group – Lady Antebellum
Favorite Country Album – Red by Taylor Swift

ARIA Awards 
(presented in Sydney on December 1, 2013)
Best Country Album – Wreck & Ruin (Kasey Chambers and Shane Nicholson)

Canadian Country Music Association
(presented September 8 in Edmonton)
Fans' Choice Award – Terri Clark
Male Artist of the Year – Dean Brody
Female Artist of the Year – Kira Isabella
Group or Duo of the Year – The Stellas
Songwriter(s) of the Year – "Leaning on a Lonesome Song", written by Gord Bamford, Buddy Owens and Ray Stephenson
Single of the Year – "Leaning on a Lonesome Song", Gord Bamford
Album of the Year – Is It Friday Yet?, Gord Bamford
Top Selling Album – Red, Taylor Swift
Top Selling Canadian Album – Fire It Up, Johnny Reid
CMT Video of the Year – "Leaning on a Lonesome Song", Gord Bamford
Rising Star Award – Bobby Wills
Roots Artist or Group of the Year – Corb Lund
Interactive Artist of the Year – High Valley

Country Music Association
(presented November 6 in Nashville)
Single of the Year – "Cruise", Florida Georgia Line
Song of the Year – "I Drive Your Truck", Jessi Alexander, Connie Harrington and Jimmy Yeary
Vocal Group of the Year – Little Big Town
New Artist of the Year – Kacey Musgraves
Album of the Year – Based on a True Story..., Blake Shelton
Musician of the Year – Mac McAnally
Vocal Duo of the Year – Florida Georgia Line
Music Video of the Year – "Highway Don't Care", Tim McGraw with Taylor Swift and Keith Urban
Male Vocalist of the Year – Blake Shelton
Female Vocalist of the Year – Miranda Lambert
Musical Event of the Year – "Highway Don't Care", Tim McGraw with Taylor Swift and Keith Urban
Entertainer of the Year – George Strait
Pinnacle Award – Taylor Swift

CMT Music Awards
(presented June 5 in Nashville)
Video of the Year – "Blown Away", Carrie Underwood
Male Video of the Year – "Sure Be Cool If You Did", Blake Shelton
Female Video of the Year – "Mama's Broken Heart", Miranda Lambert
Group Video of the Year – "Downtown", Lady Antebellum
Duo Video of the Year – "Cruise", Florida Georgia Line
Breakthrough Video of the Year – "Cruise", Florida Georgia Line
Collaborative Video of the Year – "The Only Way I Know", Jason Aldean with Luke Bryan and Eric Church
Performance of the Year – "Over You", Miranda Lambert from CMT Artists of the Year
Nationwide Insurance On Your Side Award – Hunter Hayes

CMT Artists of the Year
 (presented December 3 in Nashville)
Jason Aldean
Luke Bryan
Florida Georgia Line
Hunter Hayes
Tim McGraw

Grammy Awards
(presented January 26, 2014 in Los Angeles)
Best Country Solo Performance – "Wagon Wheel" (Darius Rucker)
Best Country Duo/Group Performance – "From This Valley" (The Civil Wars)
Best Country Song – "Merry Go 'Round" (Kacey Musgraves)
Best Country Album – Same Trailer Different Park (Kacey Musgraves)
Best Bluegrass Album – The Streets of Baltimore (Del McCoury Band)
Best Americana Album – Old Yellow Moon (Emmylou Harris and Rodney Crowell)
Best American Roots Song – "Love Has Come for You" (Edie Brickell, Steve Martin)
Best Song Written for Visual Media – "Safe & Sound" (Taylor Swift, T Bone Burnett, John Paul White & Joy Williams)

Juno Awards
(presented March 30, 2014 in Winnipeg)
Country Album of the Year – Crop Circles, Dean Brody

See also
 Country Music Association
 Inductees of the Country Music Hall of Fame

References

Country
Country music by year